AC/DC is a pinball machine manufactured by Stern Pinball based on the Australian band of the same name. Designed by Steve Ritchie, it was released on March 1, 2012.

Description
The machine was confirmed in January 2012 with the release of a teaser video showcasing the game, along with the twelve songs involved in its soundtrack. Each song is the subject of a mode, from which players can work towards a multi-ball for additional points.

It features a swinging bell involved in the Hells Bells mode and a lower playfield in the Premium/LE editions for modes that use the word Hell in the song's title.

Digital version
FarSight Studios launched a Kickstarter project on May 2, 2016, with plans to digitize the AC/DC pinball table for Stern Pinball Arcade; the announced funding goal was $108,435. Due to a new partnership, this Kickstarter was canceled as it is no longer needed to fund the new table.

The Premium version and the two Limited Editions (Let There Be Rock and Back in Black) of the table are available on Stern Pinball Arcade across multiple platforms.

The license for the digital version expired on July 1, 2019, and was removed from purchase for any platform.

References

External links 
 
  Pinside entry on AC/DC

Stern pinball machines
AC/DC
2012 pinball machines